Nomenia obsoleta is a moth in the family Geometridae first described by Louis W. Swett in 1916. It is found in western North America, from British Columbia, through Washington and Oregon to California.

The wingspan is about 20 mm.

References

Moths described in 1916
Asthenini